Łętownia  is a village in the administrative district of Gmina Strzyżów, within Strzyżów County, Podkarpackie Voivodeship, in south-eastern Poland.

References

Villages in Strzyżów County